Danny Schoobaert (born 11 March 1960) is a Belgian former professional racing cyclist. He rode in the 1982 Tour de France.

References

External links

1960 births
Living people
Belgian male cyclists
People from Asse
Cyclists from Flemish Brabant